William Chambers Coker (October 24, 1872 – June 26, 1953) was an American botanist and mycologist.

Biography
He was born at Hartsville, South Carolina on October 24, 1872.  He graduated from South Carolina College in 1894 and took postgraduate courses at Johns Hopkins University and in Germany.  He taught for several years in the summer schools of the Brooklyn Institute of Arts and Sciences, at Cold Spring Harbor, L. I., and in 1902 became associate professor of botany at the University of North Carolina.  He established the Coker Arboretum in 1903. He was made professor in 1907 and Kenan professor of botany in 1920.  In 1903, he was chief of the botanic staff of the Bahama Expedition of the Geographical Society of Baltimore.  Professor Coker was a member of many scientific societies and the author of The Plant Life of Hartsville, S. C. (1912); The Trees of North Carolina (with Henry Roland Totten) (1916); and The Saprolegniaceae of the United States (1921).  Besides these he contributed numerous articles on morphology and botany to scientific journals.  He died on June 26, 1953, and was buried on June 29, 1953.

He is also honoured in the name of Cokeromyces, which is a pathogenic fungus.

Species described
Lactarius subtorminosus Coker (1918)
Multifurca furcata (Coker) Buyck & V. Hofstetter (2008) – as Lactarius furcatus

References

American mycologists
American science writers
1872 births
1953 deaths
American educators
Botanical Society of America
People from Hartsville, South Carolina
University of South Carolina alumni
19th-century American botanists
20th-century American botanists
20th-century American non-fiction writers
20th-century American male writers
American male non-fiction writers